Beit HaEmek (lit. House of the Valley) is a kibbutz in northern Israel. Located in the western Galilee, it falls under the jurisdiction of Mateh Asher Regional Council.

History

Kibbutz Beit HaEmek was established in 1949, in part by members of the British Habonim movement. Its name is derived from that of the nearby village of Amqa and the Biblical city of Beth-emek "included in Asher tribal allotment" mentioned in the Book of Joshua 19:27, which was located 5 kilometres north-east of the kibbutz. The kibbutz was built on the land of the depopulated Palestinian village of Kuwaykat. In addition to agricultural activities, the kibbutz has scientific industry activities, such as Biological Industries, one of the world’s leading and trusted suppliers to the life sciences industry.

At around 2000, the kibbutz voted to privatize itself.

References

Bibliography

Kibbutzim
Kibbutz Movement
Populated places established in 1949
Populated places in Northern District (Israel)
1949 establishments in Israel
British-Jewish culture in Israel